The Rushworth Box-Ironbark Region is a 510 km2 fragmented and irregularly shaped tract of land that encompasses all the box–ironbark forest and woodland remnants used as winter feeding habitat by endangered swift parrots in the Rushworth-Heathcote region of central Victoria, south-eastern Australia.  It lies north of, and partly adjacent to, the Puckapunyal Important Bird Area (IBA).

The site was identified by BirdLife International as an IBA and includes the Heathcote-Graytown National Park, several nature reserves and state forests, with a few small blocks of private land.  It excludes other areas of woodland that are less suitable for the parrots.

Birds
The region was identified as an IBA because, when the flowering conditions are suitable it supports up to about 70 non-breeding swift parrots.  It is also home to small populations of diamond firetails and non-breeding flame robins.

Other woodland birds recorded from the IBA include brown treecreepers, speckled warblers, hooded robins, grey-crowned babblers, crested bellbirds and Gilbert's whistlers, with bush stone-curlews, migrant black honeyeaters and pink robins seen occasionally.

References

Important Bird Areas of Victoria (Australia)
Box-ironbark forest